Ilshat Nurgaliyevich Aitkulov (born 15 February 1969) is a Russian professional football coach and a former player. Currently, he is the assistant manager for FC Orenburg, a club he has devoted his whole career to.

Club career
On 22 May 2020, he was appointed caretaker manager of FC Orenburg. As he does not possess the mandatory UEFA Pro Licence, Konstantin Paramonov was officially registered with the league as manager.

References

External links
 

Bashkir people
1969 births
People from Sharlyksky District
Living people
Soviet footballers
FC Orenburg players
Russian footballers
Russian football managers
FC Orenburg managers
Russian Premier League managers
Association football midfielders
Sportspeople from Orenburg Oblast